Jason Petrie (born February 27, 1971) is an American politician who has served in the Kentucky House of Representatives from the 16th district since 2017.

References

1971 births
Living people
Republican Party members of the Kentucky House of Representatives
People from Hopkinsville, Kentucky
21st-century American politicians